Norra Botkyrka (North Botkyrka) usually refers to the northern residential areas of Botkyrka Municipality near Stockholm in Sweden.

Norra Botkyrka was until the 1970s an agricultural community with only  a few inhabitants consisting of a few large estates (Norsborg, Hallunda, Slagsta, Fittja and Alby) and a large protected area around the Lake Bornsjö which was and still is a reserve for the drinking water supply for the city of Stockholm. Within a few years during the 1970s, the municipalities of Stockholm and Botkyrka cooperated to build a "New Town" for more than 30,000 inhabitants.

The idea of a new town concept for Norra Botkyrka was influenced by new towns in the United Kingdom.

During archeological excavations prior to the building of the "New Town" there were found a number of rock carvings in the Slagsta area indicating that there was an agricultural population here already during the Bronze Age. During excavations conducted under the guidance of the Historic Museum of Stockholm there were found in the Hallunda area Bronze Age dwellings together with a number of bronze smelting hearths and ceramic remains from Central Europe showing that there must have been far reaching trading relations already this early.

Already from early historic times the trunkroad from Stockholm to the continent passed through Norra Botkyrka. There are now also four stations on the Stockholm Metro here: Norsborg, Hallunda, Alby and Fittja.

The area was made famous in the late 1990s through the local hip hop group called The Latin Kings who often refers to this area in their lyrics. It is also known as one of the most multi-cultural places in Sweden with a majority of the population being first or second generation immigrants. Most of these originate from the Middle East with other significant groups from for example Turkey, Chile, Finland, former Yugoslavia, China, Pakistan and the Horn of Africa. Thus in the 1970s, the municipality of Botkyrka elected the first foreign born mayor in Sweden.

Geography of Stockholm